Branko Stanovnik (born August 11, 1938) is a Slovenian chemist, specializing in organic chemistry, and member of SAZU.

References

1938 births
Living people
Slovenian chemists
Members of the European Academy of Sciences and Arts
Members of the Slovenian Academy of Sciences and Arts